2 Player Productions, Limited is a video production company based in San Francisco, California. It was founded in 2005 by Paul Owens, Paul Levering, and Asif Siddiky. The company  produces content relating to video game culture and the process of game production. They produced the documentary Reformat the Planet in 2008, and have since worked with mainstream companies including MTV and Spike.

Projects

Reformat the Planet
Reformat the Planet is a documentary film, first shown in 2008 at the South by Southwest Film Festival film festival, about the chiptune music scene. The film depicts events in the culture such as Blip Festival.

Penny Arcade: The Series
Penny Arcade: The Series Is a 27-episodes web show about Penny Arcade and PAX. The first season was aired on GameTrailers and has a positive collective review of 9.1. Subsequent seasons were produced by Vantage Point Production.

Uncharted 3
In 2010 the company was hired by game developer Naughty Dog to produce behind-the-scenes content detailing development for their game Uncharted 3.

Minecraft: The Story of Mojang

In December 2012, the company released Minecraft: The Story of Mojang, a documentary about the development of the video game Minecraft and its developer, the Swedish game company Mojang. The idea was first shown on February 21, 2011 as a proof of concept video to attempt to raise money to finish the project using Kickstarter.
The company's goal was to raise $150,000. This goal was met on March 26, 2011, however people continued to donate so that the final amount raised was $210,297. Depending on the amount donated contributors will have an opportunity to share their personal story in the documentary.

Double Fine Adventure!

In February 2012, Double Fine Productions became the first game company to fully fund a high-budget video-game via Kickstarter, a crowdfunding website. As part of their funding agreement, Double Fine pledged to hire 2 Player Productions to document the entire development process as a serial documentary, with roughly monthly episodes, made available to all backers of the project. Leading up to the release of the game's final act, Double Fine also began making the episodes freely available on YouTube in early March 2015. The 20 episode series concluded in July 2015, three months after the final act of the game was officially released.

References

External links

Video production companies
Mass media companies established in 2005
Companies based in Portland, Oregon
2005 establishments in Oregon